Milan Galić (8 March 1938 – 13 September 2014) was a Yugoslav and Serbian professional footballer who played as a striker. He was part of the Yugoslav squad that won gold at the 1960 Summer Olympics.

During his active career, Galić played for four clubs, namely Proleter Zrenjanin, Partizan, Standard Liège and Reims. He also represented Yugoslavia internationally, earning 51 caps and scoring 37 goals, being the second-highest scorer in the history of the national team, only behind Stjepan Bobek with 38.

After finishing his playing career, Galić was employed at the Football Association of Yugoslavia.

Club career

Partizan
After starting out with Proleter Zrenjanin, Galić was transferred to Partizan in the 1958–59 campaign. He spent the following eight seasons at Stadion JNA, winning the Yugoslav First League on four occasions (1961, 1962, 1963 and 1965).

In 1960–61 season, Galić won his first title with Partizan. That was also first title for The Steamroller after 1949. He scored a twice in first match of the season, in Split against RNK Split and helping club to reach first victory in the season, 4–2. He also scored two goals in Eternal Derby in a 3–0 home victory on 30 October 1960. On 11 June 1961, Galić scored hat–trick in a 4–2 away victory against Radnički Beograd, in last round and securing the title. He scored 14 goals in 21 league matches and become the top scorer of club in the season.

In next season, Galić helping club to won second consecutive title. He score 7 goals in 21 matches. He scored a twice on 27 August in 2–1 home victory against OFK Beograd and also scored another two goals on 4 March at Omladinski stadion in also 2–1 victory. Galić decide a Derby against Vojvodina in Novi Sad, on 22 October by the goal in 76th minute and also score against this team in a 2–3 home defeat. He scored an equaliser in a 3–1 away victory in Rijeka.

In 1962–63 season club won another title. Galić scored 15 goals in 24 league matches. On 3 October, he scored his first goal in European competitions, against CSKA Red Flag. He scored a hat–trick in a 4–3 home victory against Vojvodina, on 23 September, on 28 October in Eternal Derby in a 5–0 record away victory and on 25 November in a 5–1 home victory over Novi Sad. On 9 December, in last match of autumn part of the season, he scored a goal in derby against Hajduk, in a 4–1 home win, and also scored in last match of the season against the same club, in Split, in a 1–1 away draw. Galić scored one more goal, against Dinamo Zagreb, in a 1–1 home draw of first match of second part of the season.

In 1963–64 season club finished on 5th place on the league table. Galić score only 4 goals in the league. On 21 August, he scored goal in first match in the season at home, in a 2–2 draw against Vardar. He scored in a 1–2 home defeat from Željezničar, on 13 October. In April, he scored a goal in derbies against Vojvodina and Hajduk in a 3–1 and 3–0 home victories. Galić scored two goals in preliminary round against Anorthosis Famagusta in a European Cup. He continue to scoring in European cup in a 1–2 away defeat to Jeunesse Esch. He also scored in a 6–2 victory in Belgrade. In quarter-finals they were eliminated by Inter Milan.

In 1964–65 season club return the champion title. Galić was top scored together with Vladica Kovačević with 16 goals. On 16 August he scored a goal in a 2–2 away draw in Eternal Derby. Two weeks later, he scored a brace against Trešnjevka in a 2–1 victory in Zagreb. On 21 March he scored a brace again in Zagreb, this time in Derby against Dinamo in a 2–1 victory. The winning goal Galić score in stoppage time. Three days later, he score another twice in a 4–0 home victory against Trešnjevka.

Galić did play in legendary 1965–66 season, when Partizan reach 1966 European Cup Final, Galić played first five matches in the league and three in European cup. He scored in a 3–1 home victory over Rijeka, on 11 September. He played two matches against French champion Nantes. He scored a goal in 2–0 home victory on 22 September and in 2–2 draw in Nantes three weeks later. He played in European Cup Final in Brussels on 11 May 1966 against Real Madrid in a 1–2 defeat.

Standard Liège and Reims
After leaving his homeland, Galić moved to Standard Liège, winning the Belgian First Division twice (1969 and 1970), as well as the Belgian Cup in 1967. He also played for French club Reims between 1970 and 1973.

International career
Galić made his international debut for Yugoslavia in a 2–0 home win over Bulgaria on 31 May 1959, scoring the game's opening goal.

Galić was a member of the team that finished as runner-up in the 1960 European Nations' Cup. He was the tournament's joint-top scorer with two goals. Later the same year, Galić played for Yugoslavia at the 1960 Summer Olympics, winning the gold medal. He was the tournament's top scorer with seven goals, including the opening goal in the final, a 3–1 victory over Denmark.

Subsequently, Galić represented the country at the 1962 FIFA World Cup and scored three goals during the tournament, as the team finished in fourth place.

Death
Galić died in 2014, aged 76. He is interred in the Alley of Distinguished Citizens in the Belgrade New Cemetery together with Mića Orlović, Franjo Mihalić and Borisav Pisić.

Career statistics

Club

International

Honours

Club
Partizan
 Yugoslav First League: 1960–61, 1961–62, 1962–63, 1964–65
 Yugoslav Cup runner-up: 1959–60
 European Cup runner-up: 1965–66

Standard Liège
 Belgian First Division: 1968–69, 1969–70
 Belgian Cup: 1966–67

International
Yugoslavia
 Olympic Games: 1960
 European Nations' Cup runner-up: 1960

Individual
 Olympic Games Top Scorer: 1960
 European Nations' Cup Top Scorer: 1960
 European Nations' Cup Team of the Tournament: 1960
 Golden Badge: 1962
 Ballon d'Or (8th place): 1962

Notes

References

External links
 
 

1938 births
2014 deaths
People from Bosansko Grahovo
Yugoslav footballers
1960 European Nations' Cup players
1962 FIFA World Cup players
Association football forwards
Belgian Pro League players
Expatriate footballers in Belgium
Expatriate footballers in France
FK Partizan players
FK Proleter Zrenjanin players
Footballers at the 1960 Summer Olympics
Ligue 1 players
Olympic footballers of Yugoslavia
Olympic gold medalists for Yugoslavia
Olympic medalists in football
Stade de Reims players
Standard Liège players
Yugoslav expatriate footballers
Yugoslav expatriate sportspeople in Belgium
Yugoslav expatriate sportspeople in France
Yugoslav First League players
Yugoslavia international footballers
Burials at Belgrade New Cemetery
Medalists at the 1960 Summer Olympics
Serbs of Bosnia and Herzegovina